Homecoming is a tradition at many North American schools.

Homecoming may also refer to:

Books

Drama and poetry
 Homecoming (2001 play), a play by Lauren Weedman
 "Homecoming" (poem), a 1968 poem by Bruce Dawe
 Homecoming, a 1984 poetry collection by Julia Alvarez
 The Homecoming, a play by Harold Pinter written in 1964 and first published in 1965

Fiction
 Homecoming (novel), a 1981 young adult novel by Cynthia Voigt
 Homecomings (novel), a 1956 novel by C. P. Snow in the Strangers and Brothers series
 Homecoming, a 1992 novel by Matthew J. Costello
 Homecoming (Kiryō), a 1948 novel by Osaragi Jirō
 Homecoming, a 2015 novel in the series The 100 by Kass Morgan
 Homecoming, a 2003 novel set in the Star Trek universe
 Homecoming Saga, a 1992—1995 novel series by Orson Scott Card
 Homecoming, a 2015—2016 novel series by R. A. Salvatore
 "Homecoming" (Kafka short story)
 "Homecoming", a 1946 short story by Ray Bradbury
 "Homecoming", a short story by Robin Hobb in the 2003 anthology Legends II

Nonfiction
 Homecoming: When the Soldiers Returned from Vietnam, a 1989 book by Bob Greene
 Homecoming: Essays on African and Caribbean Literature, Culture, and Politics, a 1972 book by Ngũgĩ wa Thiong'o
 Homecoming: Reclaiming and Championing Your Inner Child, a 1990 book by John Bradshaw

Film and TV

Film
 Homecoming (1928 film), a German drama starring Lars Hanson
 Homecoming (1934 film), a Chinese film starring Ruan Lingyu
 Homecoming (1941 film), a German propaganda film
 Homecoming (1948 film), a romantic drama starring Clark Gable and Lana Turner
 Homecoming (1984 film), a Hong Kong film starring Siqin Gaowa and Josephine Koo
 Homecoming (1996 film), a TV adaptation of Cynthia Voigt's novel
 Homecoming (2003 film), a Philippine film of the 2000s directed by Gil Portes
 Homecoming (2004 film), a film field-produced by Roko Belic
 Home Coming (2006 film), a Greek-Turkish drama film
 Homecoming (2009 film), an indie-thriller starring Mischa Barton, Matt Long and Jessica Stroup
 Homecoming (2011 film), a Singaporean film starring Jack Neo
 Homecoming, a 2011 film starring Brea Grant
 Homecoming, a 2013 short film produced by Idil Ibrahim
 Homecoming (2019 American film), a Netflix special documenting singer Beyoncé
 Homecoming (2019 Indonesian film), a drama film directed by Adriyanto Dewo
 Home Coming (2022 film), a Chinese drama film
 Spider-Man: Homecoming, a 2017 superhero film starring Tom Holland
 How to Train Your Dragon: Homecoming, a 2019 holiday special

Television 
 Homecoming (TV series), a 2018 Amazon TV series based on Gimlet Media's podcast (see below)
 Homecoming with Rick Reilly, an American sports program, broadcast 2009–10
 The Homecoming: A Christmas Story, a 1971 TV movie which inspired The Waltons
 The Waltons: Homecoming, a 2021 remake

Episodes
 "Homecoming" (American Dragon: Jake Long)
 "Homecoming" (Buffy the Vampire Slayer)
 "Homecoming" (Dawson's Creek)
 "Homecoming" (ER)
 "Homecoming" (Falling Skies)
 "Homecoming" (Ghost Whisperer)
 "Homecoming" (Glee)
 "Homecoming" (Heroes)
 "Homecoming" (Lost)
 "Homecoming" (Masters of Horror)
 "Homecoming" (Miss Guided)
 "Homecoming" (Naruto)
 "Homecoming" (New Girl)
 "Homecoming" (Once Upon a Time)
 "Homecoming" (One Day at a Time)
 "Homecoming" (Roseanne)
 "Homecoming" (Smallville)
 "Homecoming" (Stargate SG-1)
 "Homecoming" (Supergirl)
 "Homecoming" (The Twilight Zone)
 "Homecoming" (The Vampire Diaries)
 "Homecoming" (The Wire)
 "Homecoming: A Shot in D'Arc", an episode of Clone High

Music

Albums
 Homecoming (America album), 1972
 Homecoming (Art Farmer album), 1971
 Homecoming (Bethel Music album), 2021
 Homecoming (Bill Evans album), 1999
 Homecoming (Craig's Brother album), 1998
 Homecoming (Ed Bruce album), 1985
 Homecoming (Gateway album), 1995
 Homecoming (Nazareth album), 2002
 Homecoming (Short Stack album), 2015
 Homecoming!, by Elmo Hope, 1961
 Homecoming: Live at the Village Vanguard, by Dexter Gordon, 1976
 Homecoming: The Bluegrass Album, by Joe Diffie, 2010
 Homecoming: The Live Album, by Beyoncé, 2019
 Homecoming – Live from Ireland, by Celtic Women, 2018
 Homecoming – A Scottish Fantasy, by Nicola Benedetti, 2014

EPs and mixtapes
 Homecoming (EP), by Sammy Adams, 2013
 Homecoming, EP by ASTR, 2015
 Homecoming, a mixtape by Machine Gun Kelly, 2008

Songs
 "Homecoming" (Hey Monday song), 2008
 "Homecoming" (Kanye West song), 2008
 "Homecoming", by Green Day from American Idiot
 "Homecoming", by Lil Uzi Vert from Eternal Atake
 "Homecoming", by Linkin Park from LP Underground 12.0
 "Homecoming", by Robert Randolph and the Family Band from Colorblind
 "Homecoming", by Taking Back Sunday from Tidal Wave
 "Homecoming", by The Teenagers from Reality Check

Other uses 
 Homecoming (podcast), a fictional podcast by Gimlet Media, with Catherine Keener, Oscar Isaac and David Schwimmer
 Silent Hill: Homecoming, a 2008 survival horror video game
  Homecoming: The Magazine, a publication founded by Gloria Gaither
 Impact Wrestling Homecoming, an annual professional wrestling pay-per-view event held by Impact Wrestling
 AEW Homecoming, an annual professional wrestling pay-per-view event held by All Elite Wrestling

See also 
 The Homecoming (disambiguation)
 Coming Home (disambiguation)
 Homecoming King (disambiguation)
 Homecoming Queen (disambiguation) 
 Patriation, also known as "homecoming"